China University of Science and Technology (CUST) is a private university located in Nangang District, Taipei, Taiwan.

USTC offers a wide range of undergraduate and graduate programs across various disciplines, including science, engineering, management, humanities, and social sciences. It has 15 schools and departments, including the School of Physics, the School of Chemistry and Materials Science, the School of Computer Science and Technology, and the School of Life Sciences.

History
CUST was originally established in 1968 as China Junior College of Technology. In 1994, it was renamed to China Junior College of Technology and Commerce. In 199, the college was upgraded to China Institute of Technology. In 2009, the institute was finally renamed the China University of Science and Technology.

Faculties
 College of Engineering
 College of Commerce and Management
 College of Health Science and Technology
 College of Aviation

Notable alumni
 Chang Tong-rong, Mayor of Keelung City (2007-2014)
 Lin Ming-chen, Magistrate of Nantou County

Transportation
The university is accessible South of Taipei Nangang Exhibition Center Station of the Taipei Metro.

See also
 List of universities in Taiwan

References

External links